The PyrR binding site is an RNA element that is found upstream of a variety of genes involved in pyrimidine biosynthesis and transport.

The RNA structure permits binding of PyrR protein which regulates pyrimidine biosynthesis in Bacillus subtilis. When the protein binds, a downstream terminator hairpin forms, repressing transcription of biosynthesis genes.

References

External links 
 

Cis-regulatory RNA elements